Sirotkin is a Russian masculine surname, its feminine counterpart is Sirotkina. It may refer to

Andrey Sirotkin (born 1985), Russian boxer
Liudmila Sirotkina (born 1981), Kyrgyzstani Olympic pentathlete
Marta Sirotkina (born 1991), Russian tennis player
Michael Sirotkin, American politician and lawyer
Sergey Sirotkin (politician) (born 1952), Soviet and Russian politician
Sergey Sirotkin (racing driver) (born 1995), Russian racing driver

Russian-language surnames